FurryBall is 3D computer graphics software and plug-in for real-time GPU production quality unbiased. It is also biased final frame render used for many short and full length animated movies. FurryBall was used for rendering the feature animated movie Goat story with Cheese - it was probably the first world feature animated movie rendered completely only on GPU in 2012.

Overview

FurryBall RT offers advanced rendering techniques, implemented directly into Autodesk Maya, Autodesk 3ds Max and Cinema 4D with multi-GPU support. FurryBall was developed for in-house Art And Animation studio purposes since 2009. 
FurryBall was used for rendering a whole feature movie, Goat Story 2 in 2008. It's probably the first world rendered CGI feature movie for cinemas rendered only on GPUs.

In 2015, the latest version of FurryBall RT was released with a completely rewritten core.

Features

FurryBall Render (commercial version) comes with free export scripts for the following software:

PLUGINS

 Autodesk 3ds Max
 Autodesk Maya
 Cinema 4D

References

Goat Story 2 - CGI movie for cinemas rendered in FurryBall
NVIDIA - list of GPU renderers
Autodesk Exchange

External links
FurryBall homepage
FurryBall Facebook page

Rendering systems
2009 software